Art Space 976+, formerly known as 976 Art Gallery, is a contemporary art gallery located in Ulaanbaatar, Mongolia.

History
976 Art Gallery was founded in 2012 by Gantuya Badamgarav with an aim to increase the visibility of Mongolian contemporary art. In 2017, the gallery started a collaboration with a company Alaqai and change its name to Art Space 976+.

Since its conception, the gallery has been actively organizing exhibitions, performances, and discussions with many of the leading Mongolian contemporary artists such as Enkhbold Togmidshiirev, Munkhtsetseg Jalkhaajav, Nomin Bold, Uuriintuya Dagvasambuu, Baatarzorig Batjargal, Jantsankhorol Erdenebayar, Munkhbolor Ganbold, and Davaajargal Tsaschikher, many of whom have participated in international exhibitions such as La Biennale di Venezia and documenta 14. With its growing international profile, the gallery has become a cultural hub of Ulaanbaatar, working with well-known international artists such as Walter Riedweg (Switzerland), Mauricio Dias (Brazil), Nathalie Daoust (Canada), Christian Faubel (Germany), Mirian Kolev (Bulgaria), and Outsiders Factory (Taiwan).

References

External links
 Art Space 976+ website

2012 establishments in Mongolia
Art galleries established in 2012
Art museums and galleries in Mongolia
Contemporary art galleries in Asia
Buildings and structures in Ulaanbaatar
Organizations based in Ulaanbaatar